The Oral History Association (OHA) is a professional association for oral historians and others interested in advancing the practice and use of oral history. It is based in the United States but has international membership. Its mission is "to bring together all persons interested in oral history as a way of collecting and interpreting human memories to foster knowledge and human dignity."

History
In 1966 James V. Mink, director of the UCLA Oral History Program, planned and staged the First National Colloquium on Oral History, which was held in California, at the Lake Arrowhead Conference Center, on 25-28 September. Panelists at the meeting included Louis M. Starr, director of the Columbia University oral history program; Elizabeth Mason, associate director of the Columbia University oral history program; Allan Nevins, writer and historian; Samuel Hand, history professor at the University of Vermont; and Saul Benison, writer and history professor at Brandeis University. The founding of an oral history association was first discussed at this meeting, and James Mink served as the Chairman of the new association from 1967 to 1968. 

In its first newsletter, in June 1967, the association announced that it had been incorporated as a registered non-profit educational organization in New York State.

In 1968 Louis Starr organized the Second National Colloquium on Oral History which was held at Arden House in Harriman, New York. Starr served as the Oral History Association's first president.

In 2017 the association established its headquarters at Middle Tennessee State University for a term of at least five years. In October 2022 it was announced that in January 2023 the association would move its headquarters to the Institute for Oral History at Baylor University, in Waco, Texas.

Leadership
OHA Executive Office

Stephen Sloan, Executive Director

Steven Sielaff, Assistant Director

Bethany McLemore Stewart, Program Associate

OHA Officers and Council Members

President

Tomas F. Summers Sandoval, Jr., Pomona College

Vice-President/President-Elect

Kelly Elaine Navies, Smithsonian, National Museum of African American History and Culture

First Vice President

Troy Reeves, University of Wisconsin-Madison

Past President

Amy Starecheski, Columbia University

Council

Cynthia Tobar (2020-2023), Bronx Community College

Zaheer Ali (2021-2024), The Lawrenceville School

Alissa Rae Funderburk (2021-2024), Jackson State University

Nishani Frazier (2022-2025), University of Kansas

Shanna Farrell (2022-2025), University of California

Treasurer

Mary Larson, Oklahoma State University

Activities
OHA holds an annual meeting that focuses on different oral history topics, hosts a Wiki for sharing resources, and hosts an online OHA Network for finding other members with similar interests.

OHA gives out the following awards:
Emerging Crises Research Annual Fund
Stetson Kennedy Vox Populi ("Voice of the People") Annual Award
Book Award (biennial)
Oral History in Nonprint Format (biennial)
Martha Ross Teaching Award (biennial)
Article Award (biennial)
Postsecondary Teaching Award (biennial)
Elizabeth B. Mason Project Award (biennial)

OHA encourages its members to participate in its seven committees:
Committee on Diversity
Education Committee
Finance Committee
International Committee
New Media and Digital Technology Committee
Publications Committee
State and Regional Forum

Publications
The Oral History Review is the official publication of OHA and was first issued in 1973.  Its founding editor was Samuel Hand. Released annually from 1973 - 1986, it is now released biannually by Oxford Journals.

Newsletters are released in the spring, fall, and winter each year. A Pamphlet Series provides information about topics such as oral history in the classroom and oral history for the family historian.

Affiliates
 International Oral History Association
 Michigan Oral History Association
 Midwest Oral History Group
 New England Association for Oral History
 Northwest Oral History Association
 OHMAR – Oral History Mid-Atlantic Region
 Southwest Oral History Association
 Texas Oral History Association

See also
 Association of Personal Historians

External links 

 Leading oral historian Martha J. Ross papers at the University of Maryland Libraries, President of the OHA in the 1980s.

Notes

Professional associations based in the United States
History organizations based in the United States